The Gentle Cyclone is a 1926 American silent Western comedy film directed by W. S. Van Dyke and starring Buck Jones featuring Oliver Hardy. It was produced and released by the Fox Film Corporation. Even though a 38-second movie trailer has survived, The Gentle Cyclone is now a lost film.

Plot

Cast
 Buck Jones as Absolem Wales
 Rose Blossom as June Prowitt
 Will Walling as Marshall Senior
 Reed Howes as Marshall Junior
 Stanton Heck as Wilkes Senior
 Grant Withers as Wilkes Junior
 Kathleen Myers as Mary Wilkes
 Jay Hunt as Judge Summerfield
 Oliver Hardy as Sheriff Bill

See also
 List of American films of 1926
 Oliver Hardy filmography

References

External links
 
 

1926 films
1926 short films
1920s Western (genre) comedy films
1926 lost films
1926 comedy films
American black-and-white films
Fox Film films
Lost American films
Films directed by W. S. Van Dyke
American comedy short films
Lost Western (genre) comedy films
Silent American Western (genre) comedy films
1920s American films
1920s English-language films